Muriel Fahrion is an American illustrator and the original designer of the Strawberry Shortcake franchise.

Early life and education
Muriel Norris Fahrion was born June 11, 1945, in Cleveland Ohio, grew up and went to school in Rocky River, Lakewood and Cleveland, Ohio. She was one of 7 children of John H. Norris and Catherine (Wunderle) Norris. She began drawing at the age of 4 and attended free classes at the Cleveland Museum of Art during grammar and high school. After attending Lourdes Academy in Cleveland, she earned a scholarship to Cooper School of Art in Cleveland, OH graduating with a major in illustration.

Career 

Immediately following art school, Fahrion was hired by American Greetings as a greeting card designer.  

In 1977, while Fahrion worked in her department, she was asked to come up with a rag doll character with strawberry and daisy theme in colors of pink and green for a greeting card series. It was then Fahrion created the original graphic and color depiction for Strawberry Shortcake, her cat Custard along with Blueberry Muffin and Huckleberry Pie. 

Moving to TCFC (Those Characters From Cleveland) in 1978 Fahrion continued on the Shortcake line eventually depicting 32 characters in the line. Her sister, Susan Trentel, also of Cleveland, crafted the first Strawberry Shortcake doll based on the Fahrion's original greeting card design. The line was launched in the winter of 1979 and 1980. This design made a big impact, and in two years, Strawberry Shortcake went from 12 card series to an entire selection of books, clothing, dolls, toy accessories, and home decor. The Shortcake group joined Herself the Elf, Holly Hobbie and Ziggy forming the new toy and licensing division  "Those Characters from Cleveland" (TCFC), under American Greetings banner but located in separate building. TCFC became a well known think tank for toys and licensing. While there Fahrion also worked on drawings and ideas for numerous licensing items. 

While working for Those Characters From Cleveland, Fahrion also participated with other toy design teams which included artists, prototypist and writers. She depicted the first concept art for the characters of The Get Along Gang and Care Bears, once they were tagged as licensable both properties moved to other design teams.  Like the first Strawberry Shortcake doll, many of these were first prototyped by her sister Susan Trentel who began working at TCFC. Strawberry Shortcake, Care Bears and Get-Along-Gang were all made into animations. 

Fahrion took several years away from American Greetings freelancing for Fisher-Price, developing illustrations for the Puffalumps and working with Disney and Snoopy licensing.

American Greetings' toy division eventually was reduced in size and moved back to the corporate headquarters. Fahrion then moved and became senior art director for Enesco in Chicago. After working a few years at Enesco, Fahrion moved to Noble, Oklahoma in 1995 where she worked for United Design.

Moving to the small town of Medicine Park, Oklahoma, she and her husband, Michael Fahrion, ran a freelance studio Big Rock Works until they both retired and subsequently moved to Tulsa. Following her husband's death on October 16, 2018, Fahrion relaunched her career under Outta Thin Air Studio in 2019 where she created new characters.

References 

1945 births
Living people
Artists from Cleveland
People from Tulsa, Oklahoma
People from Comanche County, Oklahoma
American illustrators